Étendard de Brest was a basketball club based in Brest, France. Their home arena was Salle Marcel Cerdan. Established in 1952, Brest played one season in the LNB Pro A, in 2005–06. After being relegated to the Nationale Masculine 1 (NM1) in 2010, the club was declared bankrupt and was dissolved in 2016.

The club also played several matches in the Brest Arena in 2015 and 2016. Brest reached the quarter-finals of the French Basketball Cup once, in 2005.

Club Honors 
 LNB Pro B
Winners (1): 2004–05

Players

Notable players

 Loic Akono
 Brice Vounang

Brest
Brest
Brest
Sport in Brest, France